The Munchi's Ford World Rally Team was a private team competing in the World Rally Championship. The team made its debut in the 2007 Swedish Rally. The cars are prepared and run by the Cumbria based M-Sport operation and Martin Christie is the team principal.

History

2007 season
The Munchi's Ford World Rally Team was founded by Argentine rally driver Luís Pérez Companc, using the name of his family's ice cream parlor chain, Munchi's. The team competed in the World Rally Championship in 2007 for ten rounds. The drivers who started the season for the team at the Rally Sweden were Pérez Companc and Juan Pablo Raies. Companc finished the rally in 15th, but his teammate Raies retired before the start of the event. Despite scoring eight points, Raies was replaced by Federico Villagra halfway through the season in Italy. Villagra would go on to score just two points. The best result for the team came at the 2007 Rally Japan when Companc and Villagra finished fifth and seventh respectively, scoring six points for the team. The team finished last in the constructors' championship with 14 points. However, the initial season for the team was simply to familiarise themselves with the series and the car.

2008 season
For the 2008 season the team contested ten rounds. Federico Villagra drove all ten rounds for the team, while Luís Pérez Companc, who also began driving in the FIA GT Championship in 2008, shared the second car with Stobart Ford regular Henning Solberg, Aris Vovos and Barry Clark, the reigning Fiesta Sporting Trophy International champion, who contested 3 rounds of the championship for the team.

2009 season
With a healthy amount of experience under their belts and the competitiveness of the Ford Focus RS WRC, the Argentinean duo of Villagra and Companc gathered a strong haul of 23 points in the 2009 season. They also had their best WRC finishes, finishing Acropolis Rally and Rally Argentina in fourth position overall.

2010 season
For the 2010 season the team took part in 8 rounds out of 13. Federico Villagra drove the 8 rounds with various co-drivers in Ford Focus RS WRC 08 car. At the end of season, the team scored 58 points and ranked 5 of the Manufacturers' championship. Villagra scored 36 points and finished 9th in Drivers' Championship.

2011 season
It was announced that Federico Villagra is going to continue in 2011 with Ford. Currently with Ford Fiesta RS WRC.

WRC results

Gallery

See also
M-Sport World Rally Team
Ford World Rally Team

References

External links

Munchi's Ford World Rally Team at WRC.com
M-Sport website

Ford Team RS
World Rally Championship teams
Argentine auto racing teams
Intercontinental Rally Challenge teams
Auto racing teams established in 2007